Katie Swan (born 24 March 1999) is a British tennis player.

Personal life
Swan was born in Bristol, to parents Nicki and Richard. Whilst on holiday in Portugal when she was seven, she took tennis lessons. Her teacher had once played for Portugal and told her parents that she showed real talent and could represent her country in the future.

Swan was head girl at Bristol prep The Downs School and a keen hockey player, representing Avon and her school when they qualified for the under-13 national finals. She briefly attended Bristol Grammar School until the family moved to Wichita, Kansas (U.S.) in 2013 due to her father's job in the oil industry. Swan was one of the very few junior players on the competitive circuit who continued in school, Wichita Collegiate School, though from August 2015 she took online classes.

Since 2013, Swan has been based in Wichita.

Junior career
In 2009, Swan won her first international tournament in Croatia, the prestigious Smrikve Bowl event for 10-year-olds, and went on to win an under-10s international title.

In 2014, Swan was a member of the four-strong GB squad, coached by Judy Murray, that triumphed in the Maureen Connolly Challenge Trophy, an annual under-18s competition, against the U.S. team.

On 30 January 2015, Swan defeated Dalma Gálfi, after facing three match points to reach her first junior Grand Slam final at the Australian Open, which she lost 1–6, 4–6 to Tereza Mihalíková.

Senior career

2015
In March, just before her 16th birthday, Swan achieved her first victories on the senior tour, coming through the qualifying draw to win a $10k tournament in Sharm El Sheikh. She beat seventh seed Julia Terziyska in the final, having already dispatched two seeds in earlier rounds.

Judy Murray, captain of the British Fed Cup team, already had Swan in her plans, to represent Great Britain in 2016.

In June, Swan competed at the Wimbledon qualifying tournament, after being granted a wildcard entry, beating ninth seed and 118th ranked Kristína Kučová in the first round, in straight sets.

2016
She was called up for her Fed Cup debut in the Euro/Africa Zone Group 1 tie against South Africa. Swan became the youngest British player in Fed Cup history at the age of 16 years and 316 days, beating the record of Anne Keothavong by 270 days.
 Swan beat Ilze Hattingh 6–3, 6–0 in the opening match of the tie. Great Britain went on to beat South Africa 3–0. During the grass-court season, she received a wildcard into the main draw at Wimbledon where she played world No. 35, Tímea Babos. Swan lost 2–6, 3–6.

2017
Following problems in late 2016/early 2017 from recurring injuries, Swan returned at the Soho Square Future in Sharm El Sheikh, winning the $15k tournament by beating Pemra Özgen in the final, in straight sets. Followed in March with another tournament win, again at Sharm El Sheikh against German player Julia Wachaczyk, in a two set final, putting Swan into the top ten British female players. In October, Swan won her first $25k tournament, when fellow Brit Katie Boulter retired in the first set of the final.

2018

At the start of the year, it was announced that Swan had joined Andy Murray's "77 Sports Management" with a statement from him saying, “Katie is a player I’ve been watching for a while. She’s got great potential and has already had some good results. I’m hoping we can offer support to her in areas on and off the court and complement the team she has in place already.” She subsequently added former Heather Watson coach Diego Veronelli to share responsibilities with existing coach Julien Picot.

In May, Swan won her second $25k tournament without dropping a set at the Torneo Conchita Martínez in Monzón, Spain. In June, she won two rounds in qualifying at the Nottingham Open, to reach the main draw of a WTA Tour event by right for the first time, earlier appearances having relied on wildcards. After receiving another wildcard for Wimbledon, Swan reached the second round, defeating world No. 36, Irina-Camelia Begu, 6–2, 6–2 in the first round.

She ended the year ranked 176th.

2019–2020
She entered qualifying of the Australian Open for the first time, however, she retired against Bianca Andreescu. Later in the year, she made it to the final round of qualifying for the French Open, before losing 4-6, 5-7 to Kristína Kučová.

For Wimbledon, she received another wildcard and was defeated by Laura Siegemund, 6-2, 6-4.
She ended the year ranked 240th.

By the end of 2020 her ranking had dropped to 267th.

2021
Swan qualified for Wimbledon, defeating Arina Rodionova 6-0, 6-4 in the final qualifying round. In the first round of the main draw, she lost to 23rd seed Madison Keys. Swan also had some success on the ITF Circuit, winning a $25k tournament in Orlando in February 2021, and the $25k Paf Open 2021 in Haabneeme in November.

2022 
Swan started 2022 season at the qualifying tournament of the Australian Open. She beat Abbie Myers in the first round but lost to Viktoriya Tomova in the second.

In February, Swan defeated Sachia Vickery at the $25k event in Santo Domingo to win her tenth title on the ITF Circuit, and sixth at $25k level.

During grass season, Swan made the R16 at the Bad Homburg Open, entering as a qualifer. She defeated former US Open champion Sloane Stephens from a set down, before losing in the R16 to another former US Open champion; eventual finalist Bianca Andreescu. Swan was awarded a wildcard for Wimbledon but she lost in three sets to Marta Kostyuk in the first round.

In August, Swan won her first $60k event at the Lexington Challenger in Lexington, Kentucky- her first title above $25k level. She defeated compatriot Jodie Burrage in three sets in the final.

In September, she made a personal best run at a WTA Tour event, making the semifinals of the WTA Indian Open. However, she was forced to retire from her semifinal match against Magda Linette due to illness.

2023
She made her WTA 1000 debut in Indian Wells as a qualifier.

Grand Slam performance timelines

Only main-draw results in WTA Tour, Grand Slam tournaments, Fed Cup/Billie Jean King Cup and Olympic Games are included in win–loss records.

Singles
Current after the 2023 Indian Wells.

ITF Circuit finals

Singles: 12 (12 titles)

Doubles: 6 (1 title, 5 runner–ups)

Junior Grand Slam finals

Girls' singles: 1 (runner–up)

Fed Cup/Billie Jean King Cup participation

Singles (2–1)

Doubles (2–1)

See also

 Junior tennis

Notes

References

External links

 
 

1999 births
Living people
Tennis people from Bristol
British female tennis players
Tennis people from Kansas
British expatriates in the United States
English female tennis players